Hybodontidae is an extinct family of sharks that first appeared in the Mississippian subperiod of the Carboniferous and disappeared at the end of the Late Cretaceous.

References

Hybodontiformes
Carboniferous sharks
Permian sharks
Triassic sharks
Jurassic sharks
Cretaceous sharks
Shark families
Prehistoric cartilaginous fish families